Polymerichthys nagurai is an extinct, superficially eel-like alepisauroid from the Middle Miocene of Japan.  The holotype specimen, no. 6599, was originally collected by Masayasu Nagura, a suzuri maker, around 1927.  The specimen demonstrates several features typical of other families of Alepisauroidei, including head anatomy very similar to the daggertooths of Anotopteridae, and a well-developed dorsal fin similar to that of the lancetfish of Alepisauridae.

Etymology
The generic name literally translates as "many meristic fish," in reference to how the fish has numerous meristics units, including how the dorsal fin, which runs down the length of the body starting from behind the head, has somewhere between 300 and 350 rays, and how it has at least 186 vertebrae.  The specific name honors the holotype's discoverer, Yuzo Nagura.

See also
Other notable extinct Cenozoic aulopiforms include:
Argillichthys, a synodontid lizardfish from the Ypresian London Clay
Alepisaurus paronai, an extinct lancetfish that lived in middle Miocene Piemonte

References

Prehistoric aulopiformes
Miocene fish of Asia